The 2015–16 Országos Bajnokság I (known as the e·on férfi OB I osztályú Országos Bajnokság for sponsorship reasons) was the 110th season of the Országos Bajnokság I, Hungary's premier Water polo league.

Team information

The following 16 clubs compete in the OB I during the 2015–16 season:

Head coaches

Regular season (Alapszakasz)

Group A (A csoport) 

Pld - Played; W - Won; D - Drawn; L - Lost; GF - Goals for; GA - Goals against; Diff - Difference; Pts - Points.

Schedule and results

Group B (B csoport) 

Pld - Played; W - Won; D - Drawn; L - Lost; GF - Goals for; GA - Goals against; Diff - Difference; Pts - Points.

Schedule and results

Second round (Középszakasz)

Championship round (Felsőház)

Schedule and results

Relegation round (Alsóház)

Schedule and results

Placement matches (Helyosztók)

Final 
1st placed team hosted Games 1 and Game 3, plus Game 5 if necessary. 2nd placed team hosted Game 2, plus Game 4 if necessary.

1st leg

2nd leg

3rd leg

4th leg

5th leg

Szolnoki Dózsa-KÖZGÉP won the FINAL series 3–2.

Third place 
3rd placed team hosted Games 1, plus Game 3 if necessary. 4th placed team hosted Game 2.

5th place 
5th placed team hosted Games 1, plus Game 3 if necessary. 6th placed team hosted Game 2.

7th place 
7th placed team hosted Games 1, plus Game 3 if necessary. 8th placed team hosted Game 2.

9th place 
9th placed team hosted Games 1, plus Game 3 if necessary. 10th placed team hosted Game 2.

11th place 
11th placed team hosted Games 1, plus Game 3 if necessary. 12th placed team hosted Game 2.

13th place 
13th placed team hosted Games 1, plus Game 3 if necessary. 14th placed team hosted Game 2.

15th place 
15th placed team hosted Games 1, plus Game 3 if necessary. 16th placed team hosted Game 2.

Season statistics

Top goalscorers

Top assists
Updated to games played on 29 May 2015.

MVP
Updated to games played on 29 May 2015.

Number of teams by counties

Hungarian clubs in European competitions
LEN Champions League

Szolnoki Dózsa-KÖZGÉP

A-HÍD OSC Újbuda

ZF-Eger

LEN Euro Cup

FTC-PQS Waterpolo

ContiTech-Szeged Diapolo

Final standing

Awards
MVP:  Dénes Varga (Szolnoki Dózsa-KÖZGÉP)
Best Goalkeeper:  Viktor Nagy (Szolnoki Dózsa-KÖZGÉP)

See also
2015 Magyar Kupa

References

External links
 Hungarian Water Polo Federaration 

Seasons in Hungarian water polo competitions
Hungary
Orszagos Bajnoksag
Orszagos Bajnoksag
2015 in water polo
2016 in water polo